Eurycallinus is a genus of longhorn beetles of the subfamily Lamiinae, containing the following species:

 Eurycallinus mirabilis Bates, 1885
 Eurycallinus unifasciatus (Breuning, 1947)

References

Phacellini